R/V Rachel Carson is a research vessel owned and operated by the Monterey Bay Aquarium Research Institute (MBARI), named in honor of the marine biologist and writer, Rachel Carson.

Ship history
The ship was built in 2003 as an offshore supply and towing vessel, and was first operated by Lytal Enterprises Inc. as the Lytal Team. After Lytal was acquired by Odyssea Marine Inc. In January 2006 she was renamed Odyssea Team.

References

2003 ships
Research vessels of the United States
RV 2003